This national electoral calendar for 2014 lists the national/federal elections held in 2014 in all sovereign states and their dependent territories. By-elections are excluded, though national referendums are included.

January
5 January: Bangladesh, Parliament
14–15 January: Egypt, Constitutional Referendum
23 January: Tokelau, Legislature

February
2 February: 
Costa Rica, President and Parliament
El Salvador, President (1st round)
Thailand, House of Representatives (election nullified)
9 February: Switzerland, Referendums
20 February: Libya, Constitutional Assembly

March
2 March: Thailand, House of Representatives (revote in 69 constituencies) (election nullified)
9 March: 
Colombia, House of Representatives and Senate
El Salvador, President (2nd round)
North Korea, Parliament
15 March: Slovakia, President (1st round)
16 March: 
Crimea, Russian Annexation Referendum
Serbia, Parliament
22 March: Maldives, Parliament
29 March: Slovakia, President (2nd round)
30 March: Thailand, Senate

April
5 April: Afghanistan, President (1st round)
6 April: 
Costa Rica, President (2nd round)
Hungary, Parliament
7 April: India, House of the People (1st phase) 
9 April: 
India, House of the People (2nd phase)
Indonesia, House of Representatives and Senate
10 April: India, House of the People (3rd phase) 
12 April: 
India, House of the People (4th phase)
Niue, Legislature
13 April: 
Guinea-Bissau, President (1st round) and Parliament
Republic of Macedonia, President (1st round)
17 April: 
Algeria, President
India, House of the People (5th phase)
24 April: India, House of the People (6th phase)
27 April: Republic of Macedonia, President (2nd round) and Parliament
30 April: 
India, House of the People (7th phase)
Iraq, Parliament

May
4 May: Panama, President and Parliament
7 May: 
India, House of the People (8th phase)
South Africa, National Assembly
11 May: 
Donetsk People's Republic, Independence Referendum
Lithuania, President (1st round)
Luhansk People's Republic, Independence Referendum
New Caledonia, Legislature
12 May: India, House of the People (9th phase)
18 May: 
Guinea-Bissau, President (2nd round)
Switzerland, Referendums
20 May: Malawi, President and Parliament
25 May: 
Belgium, Chamber of Representatives
Colombia, President (1st round)
Denmark, Referendum
Lithuania, President (2nd round)
San Marino, Referendums
Ukraine, President
26–28 May: Egypt, President

June
3 June: Syria, President
8 June: 
Kosovo, Parliament
Slovenia, Referendum
South Ossetia, Parliament
12 June: Antigua and Barbuda, Parliament
14 June: Afghanistan, President (2nd round)
15 June: 
Colombia, President (2nd round)
Liechtenstein, Referendum
21 June: Mauritania, President
25 June:  Libya, Parliament (election nullified)
29 June: 
Lithuania, Constitutional Referendum
North Cyprus, Constitutional Referendum

July
9 July: 
Cook Islands, Legislature
Indonesia, President
13 July: Slovenia, National Assembly

August
10 August: Turkey, President
24 August: Abkhazia, President
29 August: Sint Maarten, Legislature

September
11 September: Montserrat, Legislature
14 September: Sweden, Parliament
17 September: Fiji, Parliament
20 September: New Zealand, Parliament
28 September: Switzerland, Referendums

October
4 October: Latvia, Parliament
5 October: 
Brazil, President (1st round), Chamber of Deputies and Senate
Bulgaria, Parliament
10–11 October: Czech Republic, Senate (1st round)
12 October: 
Bolivia, President, Chamber of Deputies and Senate
Bosnia and Herzegovina, Presidency and House of Representatives
São Tomé and Príncipe, Parliament
15 October: 
Jersey, Referendum
Mozambique, President and Parliament
17–18 October: Czech Republic, Senate (2nd round)
24 October: Botswana, Parliament
26 October: 
Brazil, President (2nd round)
Tunisia, Parliament
Ukraine, Parliament
Uruguay, President (1st round), Chamber of Deputies, Senate and Constitutional Referendum

November
2 November: 
Donetsk People's Republic, Head and Parliament
Luhansk People's Republic, Head and Parliament
Romania, President (1st round)
4 November: United States, House of Representatives and Senate
American Samoa, House of Representatives and Constitutional Referendum
Guam, Governor, Attorney General, Consolidated Commission on Utilities, Education Board, Legislature, Supreme Court and Superior Court retention elections and Referendum
Northern Mariana Islands, Governor (1st round), Attorney General, House of Representatives, Senate, Supreme Court retention elections and Constitutional Referendum
U.S. Virgin Islands, Governor (1st round), Board of Elections, Legislature and Referendums
16 November: Romania, President (2nd round)
18 November: 
Northern Mariana Islands, Governor (2nd round)
U.S. Virgin Islands, Governor (2nd round)
19 November: Solomon Islands, Parliament
22 November: Bahrain, Council of Representatives (1st round)
23 November: Tunisia, President (1st round)
27 November: Tonga, Parliament
28 November: Greenland, Legislature
29 November: 
Bahrain, Council of Representatives (2nd round)
Namibia, President and National Assembly
30 November: 
Moldova, Parliament
Switzerland, Referendums
Uruguay, President (2nd round)

December
8 December: Dominica, Parliament
10 December: Mauritius, Parliament
14 December: Japan, House of Representatives and 
20 December: Liberia, Senate
21 December: 
Tunisia, President (2nd round)
Uzbekistan, Legislative Chamber (1st round)
28 December: Croatia, President (1st round)

Indirect elections
The following indirect elections of heads of state and the upper houses of bicameral legislatures took place through votes in elected lower houses, unicameral legislatures, or electoral colleges: 
7 February, 26 June and 20 November: India, Council of States
1 April: 
Malta, President
San Marino, Captains Regent
23 April 2014 – 31 October 2016: Lebanon, President (16 rounds in 2014)
21 May: South Africa, 
25 May: Belgium, Senate
10 June: Israel, President
24 July: Iraq, President
31 August: Macau, Chief Executive
17–22 September: Vanuatu, President
28 September: France, Senate
1 October: 
Kazakhstan, Senate
San Marino, Captains Regent
12 October: Republic of the Congo, Senate
15 October: Austria, Federal Council
10 December: Bosnia and Herzegovina, House of Peoples
13 December: Gabon, Senate
17, 23 and 29 December: Greece, President

See also
2014 in politics

References

National
National
Political timelines of the 2010s by year
National